Siraha District, a district in Madhesh Province, is one of the seventy-seven districts of Nepal. It is situated in the Terai belt of Nepal. It has population of 637,328 according to census of 2011.The District is bordered with Saptari district in the east, Udayapur districting the north, Bihar state of India in the south and Dhanusa district in the west. Majority of the population here is Yadav, Tharus, Sahs(sahukar), Muslims and ethnic minorities with majority population speaking Maithili language and Nepali language.

Lahan is so far one of the most developed towns of Siraha and is popular for Sagarmatha Chaudhary Eye Hospital. It lies in Mahendra highway.

Thadi or Thadi Viswaspatti is the main entry point for the district form India and a very old border town and a market place of Nepal in Siraha District bordering Indian town of Laukaha.

Thadi is one of the few towns which is a part of agreed route for Mutual Trade between India and Nepal. Nepal Government has set up a dedicated customs office in the town. The town connects Lahan to India.

Infrastructure
There are no airports in this district but Rajbiraj Airport in nearby Saptari district is the nearest airport to the district, roughly 28–58 km away from various locations. Shree Airlines operates daily flights between Rajbiraj and Kathmandu

Thadi in Siraha is a part of one of the agreed route for Mutual Trade and custom point between India and Nepal. Nepal Government has set up a dedicated customs office in the town and Government of India has set up a Land Customs Station. So in simple import and export are allowed through this point.

The largest town is Lahan, where there is a popular eye hospital called Sagarmatha Choudhary Eye Hospital, Lahan.

Transportation

The district is well connected with Mahendra Highway as this national Highway passes right through the district while connecting all the major towns. Other rural municipalities are also well connected by Postal Highway which is under construction and taking shape rapidly. Another major project i.e. East-West Railway also will run through this district in future and is in the process of development.

Geography and Climate

Demographics
At the time of the 2011 Nepal census, Siraha District had a population of 637,328 and male populations and female populations were 310,101 and 327,227 respectively. Female population is accounts for 51.34 percent while the male population is 48.66 percent. Of these, 85.8% spoke Maithili, 4.3% Nepali, 3.6% Urdu, 2.7% Tharu, 1.0% Tamang  and 0.8% Magar as their first language.

42.9% of the population in the district spoke Nepali, 5.0% Hindi and 3.9% Maithili as their second language.

English and Nepali are two major medium of written and spoken languages used in schools and public and government offices.

== Notable people ==
Dr. Ram Ray, an Associate Professor and Researcher, who has made hundreds of publications and has made contributions to knowledge about landslide hazards.
 Tulsi Giri - Former Prime Minister of Nepal (1975-1977), Chairman of Council of Ministers(1963, 1964, 1965)
 Pradip Giri - Nepali Congress politician and Member of House of Representatives
Padma Narayan Chaudhary- Nepali Congress politician and former minister and member of House of Representatives
Sita Devi Yadav- Nepali Congress treasurer and member of House of Representatives
 Chitralekha Yadav- Nepali Congress politician and Member of House of Representatives, Former Education Minister
Santosh Shah (sahukar)- Nepali Chef
Dharmanath Prasad Sah, Deputy chairman of CPN (Unified Socialist)
Lila Nath Shrestha, CPN (UML) leader and former minister
Mohammad Khalid Siddiqui, People's Socialist Party, Nepal Member of Rastriya Sabha
Dr. Ganesh Kumar Mandal, Nepali Congress, Nepal Elected Member of  Second Constituent Assembly from Siraha-6]]

Education 

 Surya Narayan Satya Narayan Marbaita Multiple Campus (Tribhuvan University)
 JS Murarka Campus (Tribhuvan University)
 Sagarmatha Higher School
 Lahan Technical Institute (CTEVT)
Little Star School

Administration 
The district consists of seventeen municipalities, out of which eight are urban municipalities and nine are rural municipalities. These are as follows:

 Lahan Municipality
 Dhangadhimai Municipality
 Siraha Municipality
 Golbazar Municipality
 Mirchaiya Municipality 
 Kalyanpur Municipality
 Karjanha Municipality
 Sukhipur Municipality
 Bhagwanpur Rural Municipality
 Aurahi Rural Municipality
 Bishnupur Rural Municipality
 Bariyarpatti Rural Municipality
 Lakshmipur Patari Rural Municipality
 Naraha Rural Municipality
 Sakhuwanankar Katti Rural Municipality
 Arnama Rural Municipality
 Navarajpur Rural Municipality

Former Village Development Committees (VDCs) and Municipalities

 Arnama Lalpur
 Arnama Rampur
 Aurahi
 Ayodhyanagar
 Badharamal
 Barchhawa
 Bariyarpatti
 Bastipur
 Belaha
 Belhi
 Betauna
 Bhadaiya
 Bhagawanpur
 Bhagawatipur
 Bhawanipur
 Bhawanpur Kalabanzar
 Bhokraha
 Bishnupur Pra. Ma.
 Bishnupur Pra. Ra.
 Bishnupur Katti
 Brahmagaughadi
 Chandra Ayodhyapur
 Chandralalpur 
 Chandraudyapur 
 Chatari
 Chikana
 Devipur
 Dhangadi
 Dhangadhimai Municipality
 Dhodhana
 Dumari
 Durgapur
 Gadha
 Gauripur
 Gautari
 Golbazar Municipality
 Govindapur Malahanama
 Govindpur Taregana
 Hakpara
 Hanumannagar
 Harakathi
 Inarwa
 Itarhawa
 Itari Parsahi
 Itatar
 Jamadaha
 Janakinagar
 Jighaul
 Kabilasi
 Kachanari
 Kalyanpur Jabadi
 Kalyanpur Kalabanjar
 Karjanha
 Kharukyanhi
 Khirauna
 Krishnapur Birta
 Kushaha Laksiminiya
 Lagadi Gadiyani
 Lagadigoth
 Lahan Municipality
 Lalpur
 Laksminiya
 Laksmipur (Pra. Ma.)
 Laksmipur Patari
 Madar
 Mahadewa Portaha
 Mahanaur
 Maheshpur Gamharia
 Maheshpur Patari
 Majhauliya
 Majhau
 Makhanaha
 Malhaniya Gamharia
 Malhaniyakhori
 Mauwahi
 Mirchaiya Municipality
 Media
 Mohanpur Kamalpur
 Muksar
 Nahara Rigaul
 Naraha Balkawa
 Navarajpur
 Padariya Tharutol
 Phulkaha Kati
 Pipra Pra. Dha.
 Pipra Pra. Pi
 Pokharbhinda
 Rajpur
 Ramaul
 Rampur Birta
 Sakhuwanankar Katti
 Sanhaitha
 Sarshwar
 Sikron
 Silorba Pachhawari
 Siraha Municipality
 Sisawani
 Sitapur Pra. Da.
 Sitapur Pra. Ra.
 Sonmati Majhaura
 Sothayan
 Sukhachina
 Sukhipur Municipality
 Tenuwapati
 Thalaha Kataha
 Thegahi
 Tulsipur
 Vidhyanagar

See also
 Zones of Nepal
 Paudhur

References

 

 
Districts of Nepal established in 1962
Districts of Madhesh Province